Danilo Heredia (born 26 September 1927) is a Venezuelan former cyclist. He competed in the 4,000 metres team pursuit at the 1952 Summer Olympics.

References

External links
 

1927 births
Possibly living people
Venezuelan male cyclists
Olympic cyclists of Venezuela
Cyclists at the 1952 Summer Olympics
Place of birth missing (living people)
20th-century Venezuelan people